Moisés Cabada Apreciado (born 2 November 1985) is a retired Peruvian footballer who played as a centre back and current head coach of FC Carlos Stein's reserve team.

Club career
Moisés Cabada started his senior career with Sport Boys, making his Torneo Descentralizado debut in the 2004 season. Then he played for CD Universidad San Marcos in the 2007 Segunda División season.

Cabada returned to the top-flight joining his former club Boys, where he participated in 42 matches and scored one goal in the 2008 Descentralizado season.

Then he had a short spell with Cienciano in 2009.

Coaching career
In November 2019, Cabada began his coaching career, starting with a job as the head coach of FC Carlos Stein's reserve team.

Honours

Club
José Gálvez
Torneo Intermedio: 2011
Segunda División: 2011

References

External links

1985 births
Living people
Footballers from Lima
Peruvian footballers
Sport Boys footballers
Deportivo Universidad San Marcos footballers
Cienciano footballers
José Gálvez FBC footballers
Universidad Técnica de Cajamarca footballers
Los Caimanes footballers
Peruvian Primera División players
Peruvian Segunda División players
Copa Perú players
Association football central defenders
Peruvian football managers